The Military ranks of Lebanon are the military insignia used by the Lebanese Armed Forces. Being a former French mandate, Lebanon shares a rank structure similar to that of France.

Commissioned officer ranks
The rank insignia of commissioned officers.

Other ranks
The rank insignia of non-commissioned officers and enlisted personnel.

References

External links
 

Lebanon
Military of Lebanon
Lebanon